Gökhan Tepe (born 8 February 1978) is a Turkish singer.

Discography
Albums
 Çöz Beni (1995)
 Canözüm (1999)
 Belki Hüzün Belki De Aşk (2002)
 Yürü Yüreğimi (2006)
 Vur (2009)
 Aşk Sahnede (2011) (sales (TR): 20,000)
 Kendim Gibi (2012)
 Seninle Her Yere (2015)
 Yaz 2018 (2018)

Singles
 "Birkaç Beden Önce" (2011)
 "Gelsen de Anlatsam" (2014)
 "Sonsuza Kadar" (2015)
 "Sevda Çocukları" (2017)
 "Asmalı" (2019)
 "Aşık Kalbin Biliyor" (2022)

Charts

Filmography
Series
 1998: Eyvah Babam
 2000: Benim İçin Ağlama
 2006: Maçolar
 2007: Elveda Derken

Movies
 2012: Ayaz

References

External links 
 Official website

1978 births
Living people
Turkish male television actors
Turkish pop singers
Turkish male singers
Singers from Istanbul